Marion Crawford, CVO (5 June 1909 – 11 February 1988) was a Scottish educator and governess to Princess Margaret and Princess Elizabeth (the future Queen Elizabeth II), who called her Crawfie. Crawford was the named author of the book The Little Princesses, which told the story of her time with the royal family. After the book was published in 1950, Crawford was socially ostracised and left Nottingham Cottage, her grace and favour house, which had been granted to her for life. Neither the Queen nor any other member of the Royal Family spoke to her again.

Early life and royal governess
Crawford was born, the daughter of a mechanical engineer's clerk, at Gatehead, East Ayrshire, on 5 June 1909. She was raised in Dunfermline, Fife and taught at Edinburgh's Moray House Institute. While studying to become a child psychologist, she took a summer job as the governess for Lord Elgin's children. This led her to take a role in the household of the Duke and Duchess of York (later King George VI and Queen Elizabeth), as the Duchess was a distant relative of Lord Elgin. After one year the arrangement was made permanent.

Crawford became one of the governesses of Princess Elizabeth and Princess Margaret. Following the abdication of King Edward VIII in 1936, the Duke of York ascended the throne as King George VI, and Elizabeth became the heir presumptive. Crawford remained in service to the King and Queen, and did not retire until Princess Elizabeth's marriage in 1947, Crawford herself having married two months earlier. Crawford had already delayed her own marriage for 16 years so as not to, as she saw it, abandon the King and Queen.

Retirement and authorship
Upon her retirement in 1948, Crawford was given Nottingham Cottage in the grounds of Kensington Palace, as a grace and favour home. Queen Mary, the princesses' grandmother, also provided it with antique furniture and flower prints as a mark of her appreciation.

After their wedding, Princess Elizabeth and the Duke of Edinburgh conducted an overseas tour, visiting Canada and the United States of America. Shortly afterwards, Bruce and Beatrice Gould, editors of the large circulation American magazine Ladies' Home Journal, contacted Buckingham Palace and the Foreign and Commonwealth Office to seek stories for publication across the Atlantic. Although the approach was refused by the Palace, the British government proved keen on the idea and suggested Marion Crawford, as the recently retired governess of the princesses.

In April 1949, having heard of the offer, Queen Elizabeth wrote to Crawford, saying: I do feel, most definitely, that you should not write and sign articles about the children, as people in positions of confidence with us must be utterly oyster. If you, the moment you finished teaching Margaret, started writing about her and Lilibet, well, we should never feel confidence in anyone again. However, the Queen did give a carefully qualified approval for her to anonymously provide some assistance, writing: Mr [Dermot] Morrah (the man chosen to write the articles), who I saw the other day, seemed to think that you could help him with his articles and get paid from America. This would be quite all right as long as your name did not come into it. Nevertheless, I do feel most strongly that you must resist the allure of American money and persistent editors and say No No No to offers of dollars for articles about something as private and as precious as our family.

However, the contract with the Goulds stipulated: "You will further consider publication of the articles without Her Majesty's consent (possibly with only the consent of Princess Elizabeth, or no consent) and under your own name, on terms to be arranged."

In October 1949, Lady Astor sent a copy of the manuscript from the Goulds to Queen Elizabeth for her approval. The Queen was deeply distressed, finding it shockingly frank, especially Crawford's revelations of the King's moods and the Queen's chilly relationship with Wallis Simpson. She replied to Lady Astor saying: "The governess has gone off her head", and had her private secretary send a further letter to Lady Astor. This contained the Queen's annotations on the manuscript with the request that passages of particular concern be removed. The Goulds were taken aback as they considered the account sympathetic, but they kept the response from Crawford. The first intimation Crawford had that something was wrong was when she did not receive a Christmas card that year from the Palace.

Crawford's unauthorised work was published in Woman's Own in the UK and in the Ladies' Home Journal in the United States, becoming a sensation on both sides of the Atlantic. A book, The Little Princesses, also sold exceptionally well. Later she wrote stories about Queen Mary, Queen Elizabeth and Princess Margaret. She also put her name to Woman's Owns "Crawfie's Column", a social diary written by journalists several weeks in advance.

As the first servant to cash in on the private lives of the royals, Crawford was ostracised by the royal family, and they never spoke to her again.

Later life and death

Courtiers believed that Crawford was deeply under the influence of her husband George Buthlay, whom she married after her retirement, and that he pressured her to capitalise on her royal connections, as he himself did. Buthlay boasted of it in his business transactions, and had her ask the royal family to change their bank account to Drummonds, the bank for which he worked.

Crawford's writing career came to a crashing halt in 1955 when the column to which her name was attached was exposed as a fraud. It carried details of a Trooping the Colour ceremony and the Ascot races, when in fact they had been cancelled that year because of a national railway strike. As the stories were written in advance, it was too late to stop their publication.

Crawford retired to Aberdeen, buying a house  from the road to Balmoral. Although the royal family regularly drove past her front door on their way to Balmoral Castle, they never visited. When her husband died in 1977, she descended into depression and attempted suicide, leaving a note saying: "The world has passed me by and I can't bear those I love to pass me by on the road."

Crawford died at Hawkhill House (a nursing home in Aberdeen) on 11 February 1988. Neither the Queen, the Queen Mother nor Princess Margaret sent a wreath to her funeral.

Her story was featured in a 2000 Channel 4 documentary The Nanny Who Wouldn't Keep Mum.

Notes and references

1909 births
1988 deaths
20th-century biographers
20th-century Scottish educators
20th-century British writers
20th-century British women writers
20th-century Scottish writers
20th-century Scottish women writers
Academics of the University of Edinburgh
Commanders of the Royal Victorian Order
Governesses to the British Royal Household
People from Dunfermline
Scottish biographers
Scottish governesses
Scottish memoirists
Scottish women educators
British women memoirists
20th-century women educators